The 1971 Colorado State Rams football team was an American football squad that represented Colorado State University in the Western Athletic Conference (WAC) during the 1971 NCAA University Division football season.  In its 2nd season under manager Jerry Wampfler, the team compiled a 3–8 record (1–4 against WAC opponents).

Colorado State's senior running back, Lawrence McCutcheon, rushed for 1,112 yards and caught 19 passes for 197 yards. McCutcheon later played ten seasons in the National Football League and appeared in five Pro Bowls.

Schedule

References

Colorado State
Colorado State Rams football seasons
Colorado State Rams football